The 2007 Latvian Higher League season was the 16th Virslīga season. It started on 7 April 2007 and finished on 4 December 2007. Eight teams competed in the league, playing each other four times over the course of the season, twice at home and twice away.

Season details
For the second time in a row FK Ventspils won the championship. In mid-season FK Liepājas Metalurgs had a lead of 11 points over Ventspils who won their last 11 games, conceding just one goal. FK Rīga finished third for the first time in the club's history. FC Skonto finished the season without winning any competitions for the first time, and also for the first time they would not compete in any of the European cups in 2008 as one of the UEFA Cup qualifying spots was taken by JFC Olimps Rīga for reaching the Latvian Cup final. Vīts Rimkus from Ventspils was the top scorer with 20 goals.

At the end of the season the Latvian Football Federation announced that the Virslīga would expand to 10 clubs for the 2008 season. Therefore, no club was relegated to the First League. The last time there were ten clubs in the Virslīga was in the 1996 season.

League standings

Match table

Top scorers

References

External links
 Latvian Football Federation 
 Latvian Football Federation news in English

Latvian Higher League seasons
1
Latvia
Latvia